Jemeel Powell (born August 29, 1980) is a former American football cornerback in the National Football League for the Dallas Cowboys. He played college football at the University of California, Berkeley.

Early years
Powell attended Junípero Serra High School, where he was a two-way player at wide receiver and cornerback. As a senior, he had 59 tackles, 6 interceptions and 4 returned kicks (two kickoffs and two punts) for touchdowns. He also practiced track.

He accepted a football scholarship from the University of California, Berkeley. As a redshirt freshman, he missed 4 games with a strained groin. He returned to action in the sixth game against UCLA as a wide receiver. He finished the season with 2 receptions for 42 yards and 3 tackles.

As a sophomore, he helped preserve a 46–38 triple-overtime win against UCLA, by making an interception in the end zone. He also played a key role in defeating USC, by returning 4 punt returns for 138 yards and making an interception with 4:41 minutes left in the game. He posted 34 tackles, 16 pass deflections (school record), 4 interceptions (led the team), 12 punt returns for 218 yards, a school record 18.2-yard average and one touchdown. He received second-team All-Pac-10 honors as a return specialist and honorable-mention as a cornerback.

As a junior, he was limited with hamstring and groin injuries that forced him to miss all of spring practice and 4 regular-season games. He tallied 15 tackles, one interception, 3 pass deflections and 13 punt returns for 117 yards (9-yard avg.).

As a senior, he registered 42 tackles, 5 interceptions (tied for the conference lead), 13 pass deflections and 32 punt returns for 389 yards (12.2-yard avg.).

Professional career

Detroit Lions
Powell was signed as an undrafted free agent by the Detroit Lions after the 2003 NFL Draft on April 29. He was waived on August 31.

Dallas Cowboys
On September 1, 2003, he was claimed off waivers by the Dallas Cowboys. He was declared inactive for the season opener against the Atlanta Falcons. He made his professional debut the following game against the New York Giants, playing on special teams. He was declared inactive for the final 12 games of the regular season, returning in the wild card playoff game against the Carolina Panthers.

In 2004, he competed for the starting cornerback job vacated by Mario Edwards. On September 11, he was released after the team opted to keep 3 rookie cornerbacks.

References

External links
Golden Bears bio

1980 births
Living people
Junípero Serra High School (Gardena, California) alumni
Players of American football from Los Angeles
American football cornerbacks
California Golden Bears football players
Dallas Cowboys players